D118 is the main state road on island of Korčula in Croatia connecting towns of Vela Luka and Korčula and ferry ports in those two towns, from where Jadrolinija ferries fly to the mainland, docking in Split and the D410 state road (from Vela Luka) and Orebić and the D414 state road (from Korčula).

The road, as well as all other state roads in Croatia, is managed and maintained by Hrvatske ceste, a state-owned company.

Traffic volume 

Traffic is regularly counted and reported by Hrvatske ceste (HC), operator of the road. Substantial variations between annual (AADT) and summer (ASDT) traffic volumes are attributed to the fact that the road connects a number of island resorts to the mainland.

Road junctions and populated areas

Sources

State roads in Croatia
Transport in Dubrovnik-Neretva County
Korčula
Buildings and structures in Dubrovnik-Neretva County